This is a list of episodes for the fourth season of Lou Grant.

Episodes

1980 American television seasons
1981 American television seasons
Lou Grant (TV series) seasons